George Burleigh may refer to:

George William Burleigh (1870–1940), director of the Lackawanna Steel Company and New York National Guard officer
George Burleigh (swimmer) (born 1914), Canadian swimmer

See also
George Burley (disambiguation)
George Berley, Hudson's Bay Company captain